Ron Kikinis is an American physician and scientist best known for his research in the fields of imaging informatics, image guided surgery, and medical image computing. He is a professor of radiology at Harvard Medical School.  Kikinis is the founding director of the Surgical Planning Laboratory in the Department of Radiology at Brigham and Women's Hospital, in Boston, Massachusetts. He is the vice-chair for Biomedical Informatics Research in the Department of Radiology.

Education 

Kikinis trained as a both a physician (receiving his M.D. degree from the University of Zurich in 1982) and as a researcher in computer vision at the ETH Zurich in Switzerland. During his studies, he developed an interest in using medical imaging, image processing, visualization, and human-computer interaction to enhance the performance of physicians and improve patient care.

Surgical Planning Laboratory 

Relocating to the United States in 1988, he joined Brigham and Women's Hospital's Department of Radiology, under the mentorship of Ferenc A. Jolesz. In 1990, Kikinis founded the Surgical Planning Laboratory (SPL) in the  Department of Radiology at BWH. The SPL is an academic laboratory focusing on basic and translational research. Kikinis established the SPL as a center for clinical collaboration with other medical specialties in the areas of radiology, surgery, and internal medicine.

Under Kikinis's leadership, the SPL has participated in collaborative research projects with hundreds of physicians, computer scientists, and other researchers at BWH and across the world. The SPL has advanced specific technologies such as image segmentation, data set registration, medical visualization, intraoperative imaging, surgical navigation, and user interfaces; tailored them to address specific medical problems; and disseminated them through open source software development in addition to traditional academic publication.

Academic and research career 

Kikinis was appointed professor of radiology at Harvard Medical School in 2004. In 2010 he became the Robert Greenes Distinguished Director of Biomedical Informatics in the Department of Radiology at BWH. In May 2020, he was appointed as the B. Leonard Holman Professor at Harvard Medical School, and vice-chair for Biomedical Informatics Research, Department of Radiology, Brigham Health.

Kikinis has directed or participated in a number of major research efforts. He served as the principal investigator (PI) of the National Alliance for Medical Image Computing (NA-MIC) a National Center for Biomedical Computing and a part of the NIH Roadmap Initiative of the National Institutes of Health.  NA-MIC's unique organization under the Roadmap Initiative consisted of multiple computer science and medical teams throughout the United States.

Kikinis is PI for the Neuroimaging Analysis Center (NAC) a Biomedical Technology Resource Center funded by the NIBIB. He is director of collaborations for the National Center for Image Guided Therapy (NCIGT) at BWH, an NIH-sponsored clinical research center combining diverse imaging, computational technology, and image guided therapy within the hospital operating room. He is PI for 3DSlicer, a free, open source, cross-platform medical image processing, analysis, and visualization software platform.

In addition to his activities in the US, he was appointed to the position of "Institutsleiter" (head of institute) of Fraunhofer Institute for Medical Image Computing MEVIS and Professor of Medical Image Computing at the computer science department of the University of Bremen in Germany in January 2014, serving until 2020.

Kikinis has also served on numerous boards and advisory committees for research efforts worldwide.

Publications 

Kikinis is the author or co-author of more than 330 peer-reviewed articles.

References

External links 
 

1956 births
Living people
American physicians
American scientists
Harvard Medical School faculty
People from Brookline, Massachusetts
Physicians of Brigham and Women's Hospital
University of Zurich alumni